Bradly Scott Billings is an Australian bishop in the Anglican Church of Australia. He has served as an assistant bishop in the Anglican Diocese of Melbourne, as the Bishop for Theological Education and Wellbeing, since April 2016.

Prior to being appointed bishop, Billings served in parish ministry for approximately 15 years in the Diocese of Melbourne, including serving as vicar at Toorak, and was Archdeacon of Stonnington and Glen Eira for five years.

Billings also has a significant interest in academia, and holds degrees in theology and ministry from Ridley College, a Master of Arts in Classics & Archaeology (on ancient Ephesus) from the University of Melbourne and a doctorate in theology from the Australian College of Theology on the Gospel of Luke.

In April 2016, Billings was consecrated and appointed as an assistant bishop in the Diocese of Melbourne, with responsibility for theological education and clergy wellbeing across the diocese.

In November 2016, Billings reported that he believed the election of United States President Donald Trump was a reaction to suspicions raised against the media.

Billings is married to Karen and has five children.

References

21st-century Anglican bishops in Australia
Alumni of Ridley College, Melbourne
Assistant bishops in the Anglican Diocese of Melbourne
Living people
Year of birth missing (living people)